The Kingwood Tunnel, near Tunnelton, West Virginia, was built between 1849 and 1852 by the Baltimore and Ohio Railroad on its main line between Baltimore, Maryland and Wheeling, West Virginia, under the supervision of B&O chief engineer Benjamin Henry Latrobe, II. At the time of its completion the  tunnel was the longest tunnel in the United States until it was surpassed by the Blue Ridge Tunnel in 1858.

Workers were recruited from coal mines in the area to excavate the tunnel. Three vertical shafts were established to allow work in two directions from each shaft, and from either end, using eight headings. The hoists were operated using horses. The tunneling operations used black powder as explosive. Dangerous rock conditions at the east end of the tunnel and accidents with black powder caused many casualties, with a total of about 30 deaths and 300 injuries in the excavation of the Kingwood Tunnel and the contemporaneous Board Tree Tunnel on the same line.

Although the tunnel itself was completed in 1852, track was not laid, due to problems with the east entrance. A temporary switchback track, requiring reversal at each stage, was built to provide service until the tunnel was finished. Work began in 1854 on an arched liner using prefabricated sections of iron, faced with stone against the eventual deterioration of the iron liners.  of this system were used at the east end, and another  of the tunnel were lined with brick. Lining work, followed by track laying, was completed in 1858. It was completed with two tracks, but the increasing size of rolling stock necessitated a conversion to single track after 1865. Grouting and underpinning work was required in 1889 through the entire length of the tunnel, and additional brick lining was later installed in the section with iron liners.

The single-track tunnel was bypassed by a double-track tunnel in 1912. The new tunnel's east portal incorporated the old east portal, and the original tunnel continued in service. The old bore was abandoned and sealed in 1962.

See also
List of tunnels documented by the Historic American Engineering Record in West Virginia

References

External links

Historic American Engineering Record in West Virginia
Railroad tunnels in West Virginia
Tunnels completed in 1852
Baltimore and Ohio Railroad tunnels
Buildings and structures in Preston County, West Virginia
1852 establishments in Virginia